The Magalloway River is a river in northwestern Maine and northern New Hampshire in the United States. It is a tributary of the Androscoggin River, which flows to the Kennebec River at Merrymeeting Bay in Maine, near the Atlantic Ocean.

The Magalloway River rises near the extreme northwestern corner of Maine, at the juncture of the West Branch and the Third East Branch of the Magalloway. The river flows south through logging country to  Parmachenee Lake, then descends for another  to the  Aziscohos Lake. The river ends where it joins the outlet of Umbagog Lake, forming the Androscoggin River.

Tributaries of the Magalloway include the West Branch, the First, Second, and Third East Branches, the Little Magalloway River, and the Dead Diamond River.  The Magalloway passes through the townships of Parmachenee, Lynchtown, Parkertown, Lincoln, and Magalloway Plantation in Maine, and the townships of Second College Grant and Wentworth Location in New Hampshire.

Its name is from some Native American language, meaning "large tail".

Aziscohos Lake

Aziscohos Lake extends upstream from Aziscohos Dam in Lincoln Plantation through Parkertown township into Lynchtown township. The reservoir is good habitat for brook trout and land-locked Atlantic salmon. There is a public boat launch site at the south end of the reservoir off Maine State Route 16.

See also

List of rivers of Maine
List of rivers of New Hampshire
Metallak, known as "The Lone Indian of the Magalloway"

References 

Rivers of New Hampshire
Tributaries of the Kennebec River
Rivers of Maine
Rivers of Coös County, New Hampshire
Rivers of Oxford County, Maine
Maine placenames of Native American origin
New Hampshire placenames of Native American origin